Rob Weiss is an American television and film producer, screenwriter, actor, and director. His break came in 1993 when he wrote and directed the 1993 film Amongst Friends. The film was well received at film festivals and scored Weiss a nomination for the Grand Jury Prize at the Sundance Film Festival.

Life and career
Weiss, the eldest son of Lydia and Carl Weiss, was born in Baldwin, Nassau County, New York. He attended the Parsons School of Design, studying fashion and film, but never graduated. Unemployed, he ended up living with his father in Lawrence in the Five Towns. He has attended both film and design school and worked as a promoter on Long Island, in New York City.

Weiss attended Woodmere Academy with Doug Ellin, creator of the HBO series Entourage, and wrote for the show. He wrote (or co-wrote) episodes including "Aquamansion", "The Bat Mitzvah" and "The Sundance Kids".  
 
In an August 2007 New York Observer interview with Ellin, he confirms that Weiss was the basis for the character of Billy Walsh, a perfectionist filmmaker who was a recurring character on the series. Ellin even asked Weiss if he'd play Walsh, but Weiss declined. Instead, the role went to Rhys Coiro, who looks similar to Weiss. 

Weiss was an executive producer on the HBO comedy-drama, How to Make It in America.

In 2014 Weiss partnered with Davidoff of Geneva to create the signature cigar line BG Meyer Cigar Co.; its launch was lauded by Cigar Aficionado. Deadline also reported Weiss was tapped by Sonny Barger and Fox 2000 to write and direct the feature film Hells Angels.

Weiss wrote the story and produced the film adaptation of Entourage (2015), and will executive produce the 2015 Dwayne Johnson show, Ballers.

Filmography

References

External links

 http://blogs.trb.com/entertainment/tv/cable/blog/2007/08/qa_with_entourage_writerproduc.html

Television producers from New York City
American television writers
American male screenwriters
Film producers from New York (state)
Parsons School of Design alumni
People from Baldwin, Nassau County, New York
Year of birth missing (living people)
Living people
People from Lawrence, Nassau County, New York
American male television writers
Film directors from New York (state)
Screenwriters from New York (state)
Lawrence Woodmere Academy alumni